This is a list of former parliamentary constituencies in the United Kingdom, organised by date of abolition. It includes UK parliamentary constituencies that have been abolished, including those that were later recreated, but does not include constituencies that were merely renamed.

The date of creation of a constituency, in some cases, goes back to English and Welsh seats in the Parliament of England and the Scottish constituencies in the Parliament of Great Britain.

In some cases, constituencies in the unreformed House of Commons first received a summons to send representatives to Parliament at a date considerably earlier than the date after which they consistently received a summons. These cases are indicated in a note.

No account is taken, in this article, of the temporary redistribution of constituencies used for the First and Second Protectorate Parliaments in the 1650s. See First Protectorate Parliament for a list of those constituencies.

Constituencies to be abolished in the 2020s

Projected 

 Isle of Wight

Constituencies abolished in 2010

Constituencies abolished in 2005 
The Scottish UK Parliamentary constituencies were reorganised following the creation of the Scottish Parliament, in order to remove the traditional over-representation put in place to compensate for the lack of national representation.

Constituencies abolished in 1997 
The Boundary Commissions' Fourth Periodical Review was completed in 1995.  It recommended various changes, although most of the abolitions resulting from these took place in Scotland.

Constituencies abolished in 1992 
Due to the rapid expansion, the town of Milton Keynes, the Boundary Commission for England exceptionally recommended in 1990, between reviews, that it should be divided between two new constituencies.

Constituencies abolished in 1983 
The Boundary Commissions' Third Periodical Review was completed in 1983, fourteen years after the previous review.  It proposed wider changes than the two earlier reviews and abolished a large number of constituencies, although many constituencies were simply renamed to conform to local government districts created in 1974.

Constituencies abolished in 1974 
The Boundary Commissions' Second Periodical Review was completed in 1969, but not implemented until the February 1974 election.  Many of the constituencies it abolished were in inner city areas, which were losing population.

Constituencies abolished in 1955 
The Boundary Commissions completed their First Periodical Reviews in 1954, as required by the 1944 Act.  These reviews controversially recommended further abolitions and creations, including the abolition of some constituencies created only in 1950.

Constituencies abolished in 1950 
The Boundary Commissions completed their Initial Review of Parliamentary Constituencies in 1947.  This recommended a number of changes in order that the populations of constituencies ordinarily varied no more than 25% from an electoral quota.

Constituencies abolished in 1945 
The House of Commons (Redistribution of Seats) Act 1944 established four Boundary Commissions.  Their first task was to review the largest constituencies in the country and recommend division as appropriate.  Many of these constituencies were in the population growth areas around London.

Constituencies abolished in 1922 
The Government of Ireland Act 1920 provided for a reduced representation from the whole of Ireland. As a result of the Anglo-Irish Treaty and subsequent legislation, Southern Ireland became the Irish Free State and ceased to have representation in the House of Commons and only the reorganisation of constituencies in Northern Ireland took effect.

Constituencies abolished in 1918 
The Representation of the People Act 1918, in addition to finally enfranchising women, provided for a redistribution of seats with the aim of equalising electorates, particularly where these had changed significantly since 1885.  Many smaller seats were abolished while some larger ones were divided.

Constituencies abolished in 1885 
The Redistribution of Seats Act 1885 disenfranchised boroughs with populations of less than 15,000, while several large towns and counties were subdivided into single member constituencies.

Constituencies abolished in 1870

Constituencies abolished in 1868 

The 1867 Reform Act disenfranchised the remaining boroughs with populations under 10,000 and subdivided some county constituencies.

Constituencies abolished between 1832 and 1867 
St Albans and Sudbury were both disenfranchised for corruption.  After some delay, their seats were redistributed by a special Act of Parliament.  Two were given to create new Parliamentary boroughs, while the other two were given to the West Riding of Yorkshire, which was thereafter divided into two constituencies.

Constituencies abolished by the 1832 Reform Act 

The 1832 Reform Act saw the abolition of a wide range of rotten boroughs in England.  There were also a few changes to Scottish constituencies.

Constituencies abolished 1529-1821 

The disenfranchisement of boroughs was almost unknown in the unreformed House of Commons. Apart from a few special cases in the 16th century and the temporary redistribution of constituencies for the First and Second Protectorate Parliaments in the 1650s, no borough was disenfranchised until Grampound. The Cornish borough was abolished in 1821 in an effort to avoid the more sweeping reforms that later came with the 1832 Reform Act.

Constituency abolished 1472  

A number of boroughs were represented in the Parliaments before 1467, but were not enfranchised in that year.

Constituencies abolished 1467  

A number of boroughs were represented in the Parliaments before 1467 but were not enfranchised in that year.

Constituencies abolished between 1378 and 1441  

A number of boroughs were represented in the Parliaments before 1378, but were not enfranchised by 1442. They were seldom, if at all, represented afterwards, until restored to the list of those regularly in receipt of writs of summons in later years.

Constituencies abolished between 1328 and 1376  

A number of boroughs were represented in the Parliaments before 1328 but were not enfranchised by 1377. They were seldom, if at allm represented afterwards, until restored to the list of those regularly in receipt of writs of summons in later years.

Constituencies abolished between 1308 and 1327  
A number of boroughs were represented in the Parliaments before 1308 but were not enfranchised by 1327. They were seldom, if at all, represented afterwards, until restored to the list of those regularly in receipt of writs of summons in later years.

Constituencies abolished between 1302 and 1307  

A number of boroughs were represented in the Parliaments before 1302 but were not enfranchised by 1307. They were seldom, if at all, represented afterwards, until restored to the list of those regularly in receipt of writs of summons in later years.

Constituencies abolished 1298  

A number of boroughs were represented in the Parliaments of 1298, but seldom, if at all, represented afterwards, until restored to the list of those regularly in receipt of writs of summons in later centuries.

Constituencies abolished 1295  

A number of boroughs were represented in the Model Parliament of 1295, but were seldom, if at all, represented afterwards. Some boroughs originally included in the 1295 Parliament were restored to the list of those always summoned in later centuries or the same name was used for a constituency after 1832.

See also
Constituencies of the Parliament of the United Kingdom
Irish House of Commons
List of United Kingdom Parliament constituencies in Ireland and Northern Ireland
List of parliamentary constituencies in Northern Ireland
Wikipedia:WikiProject UK Parliament constituencies/Historic constituencies
Wikipedia:WikiProject UK Parliament constituencies/Historic constituency names

References
The House of Commons 1509-1558, by S.T. Bindoff (Secker & Warburg 1982)
F. W. S. Craig, British Electoral Facts: 1832-1987
F. W. S. Craig, Boundaries of Parliamentary Constituencies 1885-1972, Political Reference Publications, Chichester, Sussex, 1972
 Frederic A Youngs, jr, ''Guide to the Local Administrative Units of England (London: Royal Historical Society - Volume I 1979, Volume II 1991).

Administration and Cost of Elections Project - The United Kingdom Redistribution Process

Former Parliamentary constituencies in the United Kingdom
 
United Kingdom, Constituencies|United Kingdom Parliamentary constituencies